Statistics of Swiss Super League in the 1910–11 season.

East

Table

Central

Table

West

Table

Final

Table

Results 

|colspan="3" style="background-color:#D0D0D0" align=center|14 May 1911

|-
|colspan="3" style="background-color:#D0D0D0" align=center|28 May 1911

|-
|colspan="3" style="background-color:#D0D0D0" align=center|11 June 1911

|}
Young Boys Bern won the championship.

Sources 
 Switzerland 1910-11 at RSSSF

Seasons in Swiss football
Swiss Football League seasons
1910–11 in Swiss football
Swiss